Amminabhavi is a village in the southern state of Karnataka, India. It is located in the Dharwad taluk of Dharwad district in Karnataka.

Demographics
As of the 2011 Census of India there were 2,423 households in Amminabhavi and a total population of 12,243 consisting of 6,226 males and 6,017 females. There were 1,550 children ages 0-6.

Jain Matha
A Jain Matha exists in this village. It is headed by Bhattaraka Swasti Sri Dharmasena.

See also
 Dharwad
 Districts of Karnataka

References

External links
 http://Dharwad.nic.in/

Villages in Dharwad district